The Georgia Billie Jean King Cup  team represents Georgia in the Billie Jean King Cup tennis competition and are governed by the Georgian Tennis Federation.  They competed in the Europe/Africa Zone of Group II in 2007, but were promoted to Group I for 2008.

History
Georgia competed in its first Fed Cup in 1994.  Their best result was reaching Group I in 1999 and 2003.

Players

See also
Fed Cup
Georgia Davis Cup team

External links

Billie Jean King Cup teams
Fed Cup
Fed Cup